Pál Sarudi (born 10 August 1983 in Szolnok) is a Hungarian sprint canoeist who has competed since 2003.

His first major success came at the 2003 European Marathon Championships in Gdańsk, Poland, where he won the C-2 bronze medal with partner Krisztian Tokar.

Since then he has concentrated on the sprint events. In 2005 he won a C4 1000m bronze medal at the European Under-23 Championships in Plovdiv, Bulgaria. He was also called up to the senior team and competed in the C4 500m at both the European and World Championships, finishing sixth and fifth respectively.

Sarudi won three medals at the ICF Canoe Sprint World Championships with two golds (C-4 200 m: 2007, C-4 500 m: 2007) and one bronze (C-4 200 m: 2006).

Sarudi is a member of the Szolnoki Sportcentrum Nonprofit Kft. Canoe Club and is coached by Attila Erdős.

External links

1983 births
Hungarian male canoeists
Living people
ICF Canoe Sprint World Championships medalists in Canadian
People from Szolnok
Sportspeople from Jász-Nagykun-Szolnok County
21st-century Hungarian people